Timothy Paul Bogar (born October 28, 1966) is an American Major League Baseball coach and a former infielder, manager, and front-office executive. In , he became the Washington Nationals’ first base coach under manager Dave Martinez.

Born in Indianapolis, Indiana, Bogar graduated from Buffalo Grove High School in Illinois and attended Eastern Illinois University, before being drafted by the New York Mets in the eighth round of the 1988 Major League Baseball Draft.

Playing career
Bogar played for three different teams during his nine-year career: the Mets (1993–96), Houston Astros (1997–2000), and Los Angeles Dodgers (2001).  He made his Major League Baseball debut on April 21, 1993, and played his final game on July 1, 2001. For his career, Bogar hit .228 (345-for-1,516) with 69 doubles, nine triples, 24 home runs, 180 runs scored, 161 runs batted in and 13 stolen bases.

Because of his last name, Bogar gained distinction as one of the Astros' "Killer B's", which included first baseman Jeff Bagwell and second baseman Craig Biggio, two formidable veteran players who helped established the Astros as perennial playoff contenders in the 1990s and 2000s.  In fact, journalist Dayn Perry jocosely noted the 1999 Astros, "in pursuit of arcane history, used eight players whose last names began with 'B.'"  The eight included Bagwell, Paul Bako, Glen Barker, Derek Bell, Sean Bergman, Lance Berkman, Biggio, and Bogar.

His only postseason appearance came as a member of the Astros in the 1999 National League Division Series.  Although Houston lost the NLDS three games to one to the Atlanta Braves, Bogar went three for four (.750) in two games played during the series.

Post-playing career

Minor league managing career
Bogar has been named manager of the year in three different minor leagues.

He started his managerial career in 2004 with the Greeneville Astros of the Rookie-level Appalachian League. Greeneville finished with a 41–26 (.612) record and won the Appalachian League championship and Bogar was selected as manager of the year. He was promoted in 2005 to the Astros' low Class-A affiliate, the Lexington Legends of the South Atlantic League, where he led the Legends to a league best 82–57 mark and was named the 2005 SAL's top skipper.

He then switched to the Cleveland Indians' organization as pilot of the Akron Aeros, the Tribe's Double-A affiliate.  In , his first year with Akron, Bogar led the team to a league best 87–55 record and came within one game of winning the Eastern League title, captured that season by the Portland Sea Dogs. Bogar was named Eastern League manager of the year, and was selected to coach as part of Major League Baseball's 2006 All Star Futures Game. He was also selected by Baseball America as the "Best Manager Prospect" in the Eastern League in 2006.   In , Bogar's Aeros finished 80–61 and again made the final playoff round, losing to the Trenton Thunder, three games to one. He was also selected as a coach in the 2007 MLB All Star Futures Game in San Francisco.

After five seasons (2008–12) as a Major League coach, Bogar was hired to manage the Los Angeles Angels' Double-A affiliate, the Arkansas Travelers of the Texas League, on November 9, 2012. He led the 2013 Travelers to a 73–66 overall record and the second-half championship of the loop's Northern Division.  The Travelers reached the final round of the Texas League playoffs before bowing to the San Antonio Missions.

Bogar owns a five-year (2004–07; 2013) career minor-league managerial win–loss record of 362–266 (.576).

MLB coaching career 

Bogar spent the  season as a coaching assistant on the staff of Tampa Bay Rays manager Joe Maddon, as the Rays captured their first American League pennant.

On November 28, 2008 the Boston Red Sox announced that Bogar would join their coaching staff as the first base coach. After the 2009 season, he moved to the third base coach job, and then served one season, as the bench coach on Bobby Valentine's staff.  However, Bogar was among several veteran Red Sox coaches who had previously worked under Terry Francona with whom Valentine did not get along, and Bogar departed the Boston organization on October 26, 2012, three weeks after Valentine's firing on October 4.

After his one-season tenure managing in the Texas League, Bogar was hired by the Texas Rangers as their bench coach on October 21, 2013, joining his fellow former Red Sox coach Dave Magadan in Arlington.

On September 5, 2014, Bogar was named interim manager for the remainder of the  season by the Rangers, following the sudden resignation of Ron Washington after almost eight full seasons at the Rangers' helm. The Rangers went 14–8 (.636) during Bogar's stewardship. During their off-season search, the Rangers hired Jeff Banister, a veteran of the Pittsburgh Pirates' system, as manager.  It was then announced that Bogar would not serve as bench coach under the new manager in 2015 and would pursue jobs outside the Rangers organization.

Bogar spent  as special assistant to the general manager of the Angels, working under Jerry Dipoto, who was his teammate on the 1995–96 Mets. After Dipoto resigned from the Angels in June 2015, Bogar remained at his post in Anaheim. Dipoto became general manager of the Seattle Mariners at the close of the  season. On October 23, he hired Scott Servais, the Angels' former director of player development, as the Mariners' 2016 manager, with Bogar appointed as Servais' bench coach.

He served two seasons with the Mariners before his dismissal at the close of the  season. Bogar joined Martinez' staff five weeks later; the two worked together under Maddon in Tampa Bay in 2008.

Managerial record

References

External links

Tim Bogar at SABR (Baseball BioProject)
Tim Bogar at Baseball Almanac
Tim Bogar at Baseball Library
Tim Bogar at Astros Daily
Tim Bogar at Ultimate Mets Database

   
   
   
   
   
   

   

  

1966 births
Living people
Baseball coaches from Indiana
Baseball players from Indianapolis
Boston Red Sox coaches
Colorado Springs Sky Sox players
Columbia Mets players
Eastern Illinois Panthers baseball players
Houston Astros players
Jackson Mets players
Las Vegas 51s players
Little Falls Mets players
Los Angeles Dodgers players
Major League Baseball bench coaches
Major League Baseball first base coaches
Major League Baseball third base coaches
Major League Baseball infielders
Minor league baseball managers
New York Mets players
Norfolk Tides players
Seattle Mariners coaches
St. Lucie Mets players
Tampa Bay Rays coaches
Texas Rangers coaches
Texas Rangers managers
Tidewater Tides players
Washington Nationals coaches
Williamsport Bills players